Manfred Schmid (born 6 June 1944 in Liezen) is an Austrian former luger who competed from the mid-1960s to the late 1970s. Competing in four Winter Olympics, he won two medals at Grenoble in 1968 with a gold in the men's singles event and a silver in the men's doubles event.

Schmid also won seven medals at the FIL World Luge Championships with two gold (doubles: 1969, 1970), four silvers (singles: 1969, 1975; doubles: 1967, 1971), and one bronze (singles: 1978). He won five medals at the FIL European Luge Championships with two silvers (Men's singles: 1974, Men's doubles: 1971) and three bronzes (Men's singles: 1971, 1973; Men's doubles: 1970).

Schmid finished third in the overall Luge World Cup men's singles championship in 1977-8.

References

Austrian Olympic museum biography 
Fuzilogik Sports - Winter Olympic results - Men's luge
Hickoksports.com results on Olympic champions in luge and skeleton.
Hickok sports information on World champions in luge and skeleton.
List of European luge champions 
List of men's doubles luge World Cup champions since 1978.

1944 births
Living people
Austrian male lugers
Lugers at the 1964 Winter Olympics
Lugers at the 1968 Winter Olympics
Lugers at the 1972 Winter Olympics
Lugers at the 1976 Winter Olympics
Olympic lugers of Austria
Olympic gold medalists for Austria
Olympic silver medalists for Austria
Olympic medalists in luge
Medalists at the 1968 Winter Olympics
People from Liezen District
Sportspeople from Styria